Glyphipterix reikoae is a species of sedge moth in the genus Glyphipterix. It was described by Yutaka Arita and John B. Heppner in 1992. It is found in Taiwan.

References

Moths described in 1992
Glyphipterigidae
Moths of Taiwan